Stefan Vasilev Popov (born on 26 November 1993), is a Bulgarian actor.

He is known for playing the role of Giogio in the Bulgarian drama film Bulgarian Rhapsody, which has been selected as the Bulgarian entry for the Best Foreign Language Film at the 87th Academy Awards.

Filmography

References

External links
 

1993 births
Living people
21st-century Bulgarian male actors
Bulgarian male film actors
People from Targovishte